The Bonn Capitals (full name: "1. Baseballclub Bonn Capitals e.V.") are a German baseball and softball club from Bonn, North Rhine-Westphalia, founded on November 8, 1989. Its first men's team has been competing in the Baseball Bundesliga since 1994 and currently plays in its northern division, the Bundesliga Nord, after initially playing in the southern division until 1996. The women's softball team was promoted to the northern division of the Softball Bundesliga in 2018.

The Capitals have won the northern division championship eight times and advanced to the finals of the Bundesliga play-offs seven times, winning twice (in 2018 and 2022). They were runners-up in the European Cup in 2021, the third German team ever to do so and the first in over a decade. In the 2022 European Cup, the team advanced to the semi-finals before being narrowly defeated by Parma Baseball Club and subsequently secured the third place after defeating San Marino.

Club structure 
The club consists of 16 teams total, including:

 1st Men's Baseball Team, 1. Bundesliga (1st Division)
 2nd Men's Baseball Team, 2. Bundesliga (2nd Division)
 1st Women's Softball Team, Bundesliga
 2nd Women's Softball Team, Landesliga (State League)

as well as baseball teams playing in the NRW-Liga (State League) and Bezirksliga (District League) and a number of junior teams.

Women's softball teams 
The first women's softball team was established in 1992 and played its first season the following year. In 1994, it was disbanded following an accident and would not be reestablished until 2005. In 2018, the reformed team ascended to the Softball Bundesliga. A second team is playing in the Landesliga (State League). Bonn first reached the play-off finale for the German softball championship in 2021, losing to the Wesseling Vermins, but won the Deutschlandpokal Softball in the same year. In 2022, the team again faced Wesseling in the Bundesliga finale and went on to win their first league championship.

Due to winning the Deutschlandpokal in 2021, the Capitals represented Germany in Group A of the 30th Women's European Cup Winners Cup, which was held in Viladecans, Spain between August 15 and 20 in 2022. The 1st Women's Softball Team finished their first participation in an international competition ranked third.

Ballpark 
The Bonn Capital's ballpark is located in the Rheinaue park in the district of Hochkreuz in northern Bad Godesberg. The facilities consist of two baseball fields and one softball field for professional play as well as a smaller baseball field for students. The fields are arranged in a clover formation.

The Rheinaue Stadium hosted the European Baseball Championship in 2001 and 2019, co-hosting with Solingen on the latter occasion. The 2009 European Junior Baseball Championship also took place here.

It also hosted the 2022 European Champions Cup from June 7 to 11, wherein the Bonn Capitals competed in Group B.

References

External links 

 Official Website
 Baseball Bundesliga Page
 Bonn Capitals Baseball Youtube channel
 Bonn Capitals Softball Youtube channel

Baseball teams in Germany
Sport in Bonn